Henry Garnett Shirley (1874 – July 16, 1941) was Commissioner of the Virginia Department of Highways. He was a leader in national highway policy and oversaw the development of an extensive state highway system in Virginia.

Early life
Henry Garnett Shirley was born in Locust Dale in Jefferson County, West Virginia, the son of Robert Vinson Shirley and Julia Moore Baylor. He attended Charles Town Academy. He graduated from the Virginia Military Institute in 1896 with a civil engineering degree and later earned a doctorate degree from the University of Maryland. He played on the football team at the Virginia Military Institute.

Career
From 1898 to 1900, Shirley served as commandant of cadets and professor of military science at Horner Military School in Oxford, North Carolina. He then served in the United States Volunteers during the Spanish–American War. After the war, Shirley worked for the New York Central and Hudson River Railroad and other railroad companies and for the engineering department of the District of Columbia. He was roads engineer for Baltimore County, Maryland from 1904 to 1912, and chief engineer of the Maryland State Roads Commission. During World War I, he served on the Highway Transport Committee, Council of National Defense, helping keep the roads of the nation in shape to handle military traffic. In 1918, he became executive secretary of the Federal Highway Council. Around 1920, Shirley worked again as a roads engineer for Baltimore County.

In 1922, Shirley was appointed as State Highway Commissioner by Virginia Governor E. Lee Trinkle. He continued to serve under Governors Harry F. Byrd, John Garland Pollard, George C. Peery, and James H. Price until his death. The Department of Highways was created as a state agency in 1927. He was a founder and served as the first president of the American Association of State Highway and Transportation Officials. He approved and promoted plans for the first limited access highway in Virginia, extending from Route 1 in Northern Virginia to the 14th Street Bridge in Washington, D.C. Construction on the highway began shortly after his death. This road was named as the Henry G. Shirley Memorial Highway in his honor, and now is part of I-95 and I-395.

Personal life
Shirley married twice. Shirley married Alice Robertson Graham, of Oxford, North Carolina and daughter of Judge A. W. Graham Sr., in 1904. She died in 1916 and they had five children. He later married Sara Anne Berkeley in 1930.

Shirley died on July 16, 1941, at his home in Richmond. He was buried at Hollywood Cemetery in Richmond.

References

 

1874 births
1941 deaths
People from Jefferson County, West Virginia
People from Richmond, Virginia
Virginia Military Institute alumni
VMI Keydets football players
University of Maryland, College Park alumni
American military personnel of the Spanish–American War
Council of National Defense
Burials at Hollywood Cemetery (Richmond, Virginia)